The Pindus Mountains mixed forests constitute a terrestrial ecoregion of Europe according to both the WWF and Digital Map of European Ecological Regions by the European Environment Agency. It belongs to the  Mediterranean forests, woodlands, and scrub biome, and is in the Palearctic realm.

The Pindus Mountains mixed forests are situated in the montane parts of the southern Balkans in the wide altitudinal range above 300–500 m. They cover Taygetus on the Peloponnesus in the south, occur in the mountain ranges of Central Greece (including the Pindus), eastern Albania and the southwestern part of North Macedonia, extend to the Drin River valley in the north and occupy 39,500 km² (15,300 sq. mi) in the three countries.

The ecoregion is landlocked and surrounded by the Aegean and Western Turkey sclerophyllous and mixed forests (in Greece), Illyrian deciduous forests (in Greece and Albania), Dinaric Mountains mixed forests (in Albania to the north of the Drin) and Balkan mixed forests (in Kosovo, North Macedonia and Greece).

The climate of the ecoregion is mostly of Köppen's Mediterranean type with hot summers (Csa). 

Due to the wide altitudinal range of this ecoregion the highest elevations (above 1,000-1,400 m) are covered with coniferous forests, with a mixed broadleaf zone occurring lower. The coniferous forests are dominated by Pinus nigra subsp. nigra var. pallasiana, Abies cephalonica and A. borisii-regis, with deciduous European Beech in the north. Juniperus foetidissima occurs widely near the tree line. The dominant species on the lower elevations are remarkably diverse, including Aesculus hippocastanum (in more damp places) and various deciduous oaks (Quercus frainetto, Q. pubescens, Q. cerris, Q. trojana, Q. petraea). Evergreen oaks, mainly Q. calliprinos, and other Mediterranean sclerophyll shrubland species are abundant on dry and rocky south-facing slopes.

Phytogeographically, the ecoregion is shared between the East Mediterranean province of the Mediterranean Region and the Illyrian province of the Circumboreal Region within the Holarctic Kingdom (Armen Takhtajan's delineation).

National parks
Chelmos-Vouraikos National Park (Greece)
Mount Olympus (Greece)
Mount Parnassus (Greece)
Mount Oeta (Greece)
Vikos–Aoös National Park (Greece)
Pindus National Park (Greece)
Lake Prespa (Greece)
Mount Dajt (Albania)
Lurë National Park (Albania)
Tomorr (Albania)
Galičica (North Macedonia)
Pelister (North Macedonia)

References

External links

Ecoregions of Albania
Ecoregions of Europe
Ecoregions of Greece
Environment of the Balkans
Ecoregions of the Mediterranean Basin
Forests of Greece
Mediterranean forests, woodlands, and scrub
Palearctic ecoregions
Montane forests